Conflict 2500 is video game published by Avalon Hill in 1981 for the Apple II, Atari 8-bit family, Commodore PET, and TRS-80.

Gameplay
Conflict 2500 is a game in which the player must use a band of warships to seek and destroy invading berserkers moving invisibly.

Development
The game was designed by William David Volk. Volk says that at the time he was a fan of the animated series Star Blazers and borrowed themes from the show for Conflict 2500. Volk also explained that he had played the Startrek game and wanted a more complex version of that game.

Reception
Jon Mishcon reviewed Conflict 2500 in The Space Gamer No. 45. Mishcon commented that "Not great, but easily worth [the price]."

References

External links
Conflict 2500 at Atari Mania
http://www.mobygames.com/game/conflict-2500
https://gamefaqs.gamespot.com/appleii/943996-conflict-2500
Review in 80 Micro
Review in ANALOG Computing

1981 video games
Apple II games
Atari 8-bit family games
Commodore PET games
TRS-80 games